Cosmocampus elucens (shortfin pipefish, or Poey's pipefish) is a species of marine fish of the family Syngnathidae. It is found in the western Atlantic, off the U.S. east coast, Bermuda, the Bahamas, the Gulf of Mexico, throughout the Caribbean Sea, and off the coast of Brazil. It is expected to feed on small crustaceans, similar to other pipefishes. This species is ovoviviparous, with males carrying eggs and giving birth to live young.

Identifying features

This species can be identified by its slender body, tan to greenish brown colouring, mottled upper body and sides, widely spaced pale bars along its trunk, and pair of dark stripes behind its eyes.

References

Further reading

Florent’s Guide To The Tropical Reefs
iNaturalist

External links
 

elucens
Marine fish
Taxa named by Felipe Poey
Fish described in 1868